Kvaratskhelia is a Georgian surname that may refer to:
 Badri Kvaratskhelia (born 1965), Georgian-born Azerbaijani footballer
 Givi Kvaratskhelia (born 1979), Georgian footballer
 Juma Kvaratskhelia (born 1969), Georgian footballer
 Khvicha Kvaratskhelia (born 2001), Georgian footballer

Surnames of Georgian origin
Georgian-language surnames
Surnames of Abkhazian origin